Skakavac, Croatia  is a village in Croatia.

Populated places in Karlovac County